I Love the '90s: Part Deux is a television mini-series and the fifth installment of the I Love the... series on VH1 about 1990s culture with 10 episodes. It premiered on January 17, 2005. This series is a sequel to I Love the '90s and the title is a reference to the 1993 comedy, Hot Shots! Part Deux.

Commentators

Carlos Alazraqui
Stephen Baldwin
Dicky Barrett
Amanda Beard
Bell Biv DeVoe
Bill Bellamy
Michael Ian Black
Herschel Bleefeld
Chris Booker
Bowling for Soup (Jaret Reddick and Chris Burney)
Brandy
Connie Britton
Vinnie Brown
Michael Bublé
Emma Bunton
Enrico Colantoni
Vanessa Carlton
Gabrielle Carteris
Lacey Chabert
JC Chasez
Gary Cole
Ronny Cox
Jamie Cullum
Molly Culver
The Darkness (Justin Hawkins & Ed Graham and Dan Hawkins & Frankie Poullain)
Tommy Davidson
Morris Day
DC The Brain Supreme
Mark DeCarlo
Jamie Lynn DiScala
DJ Jazzy Jeff
The Donnas (Brett Anderson & Allison Robertson and Torry Castellano & Maya Ford)
Thomas F. Duffy
Bil Dwyer
Lisa Edelstein
Rich Eisen
Missy Elliot
David James Elliott
Bill Engvall
Kevin Eubanks
Evan Farmer
Fatboy Slim
Craig Ferguson
Miguel Ferrer
Greg Fitzsimmons
Flavor Flav
Jake Fogelnest
Jim Forbes
Doug E. Fresh
Daisy Fuentes
Andrew Gentile
David Gianapolous
Greg Giraldo
Jaime Gleicher
Godfrey
Macy Gray
Kathy Griffin
Greg Grunberg
Bob Guiney
Luis Guzmán
Chris Hardwick
Hill Harper
Rachael Harris
Hulk Hogan
Scott Ian
Countess Vaughn James
Jane's Addiction (Dave Navarro and Stephen Perkins)
Richard Jeni
Chris Jericho
Jill Jones
Jordan Knight
Jo Koy
Russ Leatherman
Juliette Lewis
Lit (Allen Shellenberger & Jeremy Popoff and A. Jay Popoff & Kevin Baldes)
Beth Littleford
Lisa Loeb
Jeremy London
Loni Love
Christopher Lowell
Stephen Lynch
Elle Macpherson
Kathleen Madigan
Virginia Madsen
Cindy Margolis
Constance Marie
Biz Markie
Kellie Martin
Jackie Martling
Debbie Matenopoulos
John Mayer
Edwin McCain
Darryl McDaniels
Jason Mewes
Bret Michaels
Penelope Ann Miller
Dominique Moceanu
Colin Mochrie
Modern Humorist (Michael Colton and John Aboud)
Dominic Monaghan
Shelley Morrison
Nelson
Patrice O'Neal
Dolores O'Riordan
John Ondrasik
Brian Palermo
Tom Papa
Trey Parker
Vincent Pastore
Marcus T. Paulk
Rob Paulsen
Kal Penn
Tony Perkins
Aaron Peirsol
Brian Posehn
Megyn Price
Jeff Probst
Rachel Quaintance
Sheryl Lee Ralph
Mary Lynn Rajskub
Simon Rex
Alfonso Ribeiro
Erica Rivinoja
Mo Rocca
Steve Rolln
Henry Rollins
David Lee Roth
Darius Rucker
Faith Salie
Kaitlin Sandeno
Andrea Savage
Stuart Scott
Billy Sheehan
Brad Sherwood
Jamie-Lynn Sigler
Bill Simmons
Sir Mix-A-Lot
Kerr Smith
Kevin Smith
Barry Sobel
Hal Sparks
Ben Stein
French Stewart
Heidi Strobel
Niki Taylor
Paul F. Tompkins
Tamara Tunie
Uncle Kracker
Brian Unger
Frank Vincent
Andrew W.K.
David Wain
Lauren Weedman
Steven Weber
Kevin Weisman
Jaleel White
Chris Williams
Wilson Phillips
Weird Al Yankovic

Recurring segments
 Raw: Each commentator gives their opinion on a topic that was covered by each year.
 Ben Stein's Pimpest Tracks: Ben Stein presents a list of the popular rap songs of the year.
 Jay & Silent Bob's Guys We'll Go Gay For: Jay and Silent Bob present a list of male celebrities or fictional characters from each year.
 Bootyfone: In a parody of Moviefone, Russ Leatherman lists the three songs most conducive to a romantic environment.
 Andrea's 90210 Lost Diary: A summary of the events in Beverly Hills, 90210 is read from a journal, ostensibly from the point of view of Andrea Zuckerman.
 College Radio Cut: Lit's A. Jay and Jeremy Popoff discuss the college rock song of the year.
 Then and Now: Emma Bunton presents a comparison of trends in the given year and the present day.

Topics covered by year

1990
Misery
Supermarket Sweep 
"Poison" by Bell Biv DeVoe 
Fanny packs
Nelson
2 Live Crew 
MTV Unplugged 
"Opposites Attract" by Paula Abdul 
Dolphin-safe tuna
James "Buster" Douglas' defeat of Mike Tyson 
Days of Thunder
The Fresh Prince of Bel-Air
Dick Tracy
Moscow gets its first McDonald's
Cop Rock
Caller ID
Total Recall and Kindergarten Cop

Raw: Michael Ian Black on '90s fans

Ben Stein's Pimpest Tracks of 1990: "911 is a Joke" by Public Enemy, "100 Miles and Runnin'" by N.W.A and "I Left My Wallet in El Segundo" by A Tribe Called Quest

Jay & Silent Bob's Guys We'll Go Gay For in 1990: Arnold Schwarzenegger and Kiefer Sutherland

Bootyfone 1990: "Come Back to Me" by Janet Jackson, "Close to You" by Maxi Priest and "All I Wanna Do Is Make Love to You" by Heart

Andrea's 90210 Lost Diary of 1990: October 4, 1990 (Season 1) – "Dear Diary – Today, two new twins, Brandon and Brenda Walsh, started West Beverly. They're from Minnesota and clueless. Brandon asked to work on the school paper. I wanted to tell him to work on those sideburns first and then me, but I have an image to uphold and everyone buys it. Suckers! Peace out!"

College Radio Cut of 1990: "The Summer" by Yo La Tengo

Then and Now 1990: Then - Donald Trump & Marla Trump / Now - Donald Trump & Melania Trump, Then - Portable CD Players / Now - iPods, and Then - Vanilla Ice / Now - Eminem

1991
 Robin Hood: Prince of Thieves
 Planet Hollywood
 David Duke
 "Bring Tha Noize" by Public Enemy and Anthrax
 Lollapalooza
 Jungle Fever
 Dissolution of the Soviet Union
 Terminator 2: Judgment Day
 "Wicked Game" by Chris Isaak (originally released in 1989)
 The Atlanta Braves Tomahawk Chop controversy
 Starter Jackets and Pagers (and their use for numeric spelling)
 "Give It Away" by Red Hot Chili Peppers
 Wilt Chamberlain's controversial autobiography A View From Above
 "More Than Words" by Extreme
 Rugrats
 Cape Fear

Ben Stein's Pimpest Tracks of 1991: "Summertime" by DJ Jazzy Jeff & The Fresh Prince, "Can't Truss It" by Public Enemy and "Jackin' for Beats" by Ice Cube

Jay & Silent Bob's Guys We'll Go Gay For in 1991: Val Kilmer and Kevin Costner

Bootyfone 1991: "I Adore Mi Amor" by Color Me Badd, "I Can't Wait Another Minute" by Hi-Five and "Because I Love You" by Stevie B

Andrea's 90210 Lost Diary of 1991: December 12, 1991 (Season 2) – "Dear Diary – Today, Brenda lost her virginity to that James Dean poser Dylan and he's even older than me. What is he, like, 37? I hate Emily Valentine. She slipped Brandon some U4EA the other night. How lame is that? Come on, Brando, I am the real deal. And Donna scored a 620 on her SATs like she even knows how to spell SAT. What a bunch of dumb asses! Eat me!"

College Radio Cut of 1991: "Dirty Boots" by Sonic Youth

Raw: Michael Ian Black on Wilt Chamberlain

Then and Now 1991: Then - Joey Lawrence & Marky Mark and the Funky Bunch / Now - Joseph Lawrence & Mark Wahlberg, Then - Blossom / Now - The O.C., and Then - Elizabeth Taylor & Larry Fortensky / Now - Jennifer Lopez & Marc Anthony

1992
The Crying Game
American Gladiators 
Thighmaster
"Jump Around" by House of Pain
Singles
Studs 
Men Are from Mars, Women Are from Venus by John Gray
"To Be With You" by Mr. Big 
The Nicotine Patch
Bill Clinton "didn't inhale"
"Cop Killer" by Body Count
Mad About You 
George H.W. Bush vomits on Japan's prime minister
Larry Bird retires
Sinéad O'Connor rips a picture of the Pope on Saturday Night Live
A League of Their Own
Teen Talk Barbie
Euro Disneyland
Northern Exposure 
White Men Can't Jump

Ben Stein's Pimpest Tracks of 1992: "Set Adrift on Memory Bliss" by P.M. Dawn, "Flavor of the Month" by Black Sheep and "They Want EFX" by Das EFX

Jay & Silent Bob's Guys We'll Go Gay For in 1992: Matt Dillon and Wesley Snipes

Bootyfone 1992: "Masterpiece" by Atlantic Starr, "Forever in Love" by Kenny G and "Save the Best for Last" by Vanessa Williams

Raw: Hal Sparks on Bush barfs

College Radio Cut of 1992: "Push th' Little Daisies" by Ween

Andrea's 90210 Lost Diary of 1992: November 4, 1992 (Season 3) – "Dear Diary – Thanks to a hit-and-run driver, I got two broken legs. Everyone thinks I'm upset because I might miss school. I hate everyone! Brenda sneaked down to Mexico with Dylan and then her father had to come down and bail her out at the border. I mean, really, who sneaks into Mexico? I'm outie!"

Then and Now 1992: Then - The Tonight Show Starring Johnny Carson / Now - The Tonight Show with Jay Leno, Then - Sex by Madonna / Now - Kabbalah, and Then - "Baby Got Back" by Sir Mix-a-Lot / Now - "Lean Back" by Terror Squad

1993
Cliffhanger
Energizer Bunny 
"I'm Gonna Be (500 Miles)" by The Proclaimers
Chicken Soup for the Soul 
"Don't ask, don't tell" 
Mrs. Doubtfire
"Creep" by Radiohead
Monica Seles gets stabbed
Paintball 
Falling Down
"Insane in the Brain" by Cypress Hill
What's Eating Gilbert Grape
Leprechaun
Great Flood of 1993
Frank Sinatra's Duets album
Animaniacs 
Zima
True Romance

Ben Stein's Pimpest Tracks of 1993: "Slam" by Onyx, "Passin' Me By" by The Pharcyde and "Rebirth of Slick" by Digable Planets

Jay & Silent Bob's Guys We'll Go Gay For in 1993: Sylvester Stallone and Robert Redford

Bootyfone 1993: "Knockin' Da Boots" by H-Town, "Again" by Janet Jackson and "One Last Cry" by Brian McKnight

Andrea's 90210 Lost Diary of 1993: May 7, 1993 (Season 3) – "Dear Diary – Quelle surprise! The West Beverly Class of '93 graduated with me as their valedictorian. Boring, so they say. Donna got drunk and wasn't allowed to participate in graduation. Then, all the idiots shouted 'Donna Martin graduates' and they let her. There must be a way to keep them off from reproducing. I'm outie, 5000!"

College Radio Cut of 1993: "My Name is Mud" by Primus

Raw: Rachael Harris on Zima

Then and Now 1993: Then - Lois & Clark: The New Adventures of Superman / Now - Smallville, Then - The Final Episode of Cheers / Now - The Final Episode of Friends, and Then - Mel Gibson directing The Man Without a Face / Now - Mel Gibson directing The Passion of the Christ

1994
 The Wonderbra
 Anna Nicole Smith marries J. Howard Marshall
 Tales From The Crypt 
 The Cranberries
 The Club 
 Michael Fay's caning
 Benedictine Monks' Chant album
 The Adventures of Priscilla, Queen of the Desert
 Models, Inc.
 Warehouse clubs
 "Loser" by Beck
 New York Rangers win the Stanley Cup
 Blues Traveler
 Clerks
 Tony Little
 Counting Crows
 Ricola
 Natural Born Killers

Ben Stein's Pimpest Tracks of 1994: "Keep Ya Head Up" by 2pac, "U.N.I.T.Y." by Queen Latifah and "Fantastic Voyage" by Coolio

In Memory of Kurt Cobain, the Eternal God of Grunge (1967–1994)

Bootyfone 1994: "Bump n' Grind" by R. Kelly, "I Wanna Be Down" by Brandy and "I Swear" by All-4-One

Andrea's 90210 Lost Diary of 1994: January 12, 1994 (Season 4) – "Dear Diary – Sweet! I lost my virginity and I am pregnant. Welcome to Edgeville, population: Andrea. Donna is really into that tough guy Ray Pruitt. I liked him better on 'The Heights'. How do you talk to an angel? Apparently in a whisper. I crack myself up. I'm out!"

College Radio Cut of 1994: "Cut Your Hair" by Pavement

Jay & Silent Bob's Guys We'll Go Gay For in 1994: Woody Harrelson and Dante or Randal

Then and Now 1994: Then - The Lion King / Now - Shrek & Shrek 2, Then - Oasis / Now - Coldplay, and Then - Bill Clinton wears boxers / Now - Bill Clinton needs bypass

1995
The Usual Suspects
Fashion Cafe
"Boombastic" by Shaggy
NewsRadio
Species
Psychic Friends Network
Starbucks
Mallrats
Se7en
Newt Gingrich vs. women in the military
The hemp debate
"This Is How We Do It" by Montell Jordan
To Wong Foo, Thanks for Everything! Julie Newmar
 Babydoll dresses
Moviefone 
Six Degrees of Kevin Bacon
The trial of O.J. Simpson

Raw: Juliette Lewis on Shaggy

Ben Stein's Pimpest Tracks of 1995: "Player's Anthem" by Junior M.A.F.I.A., "I Wish" by Skee-Lo and "Big Poppa" by Notorious B.I.G.

Jay & Silent Bob's Guys We'll Go Gay For in 1995: Patrick Swayze and Tom Hanks

Bootyfone 1995: "Water Runs Dry" by Boyz II Men, "Candy Rain" by Soul 4 Real and "Brown Sugar" by D'Angelo

Andrea's 90210 Lost Diary of 1995: May 24, 1995 (Season 5) – "Dear Diary – I am finally going off to Yale. Anyway, Dylan married the daughter of his father's murderer and then she was murdered by her father's hitmen who were actually trying to kill Dylan. Can you say ratings? Also, Ray threw Donna down the stairs and she forgave him. Probably belted out a few bars of 'hold on' so played out. I miss them already. Later!"

College Radio Cut of 1995: "Seether" by Veruca Salt

Then and Now 1995: Then - Elijah Wood in North / Now - Elijah Wood in The Lord of the Rings trilogy, Then - David Letterman getting flashed by Drew Barrymore on Late Show with David Letterman / Now - David Letterman getting flashed by Courtney Love on Late Show with David Letterman, and Then - Internet access / Now - DSL

1996
 Kerri Strug
 The Crocodile Hunter
 Romeo + Juliet
 The Caesar haircut
 Jeff Foxworthy's redneck routine
 "Woo Hah!! Got You All in Check" by Busta Rhymes
 Pamela Anderson and Tommy Lee's sex tape
 Deion "Primetime" Sanders
 East Coast-West Coast hip hop rivalry
 Jenny McCarthy
 David Crosby fathers Melissa Etheridge's child
 "I Believe I Can Fly" by R. Kelly
 The Unabomber
 Michael Flatley
 7th Heaven
 Evita

Raw: Modern Humorist on Kerri

Ben Stein's Pimpest Tracks of 1996: "Sure Shot" by Beastie Boys, "California Love" by 2Pac feat. Dr. Dre and "Tha Crossroads" by Bone Thugs-n-Harmony

Jay & Silent Bob's Guys We'll Go Gay For in 1996: Leonardo DiCaprio and Ving Rhames

Bootyfone 1996: "Don't Let Go (Love)" by En Vogue, "You're Makin Me High" by Toni Braxton and "No Diggity" by Blackstreet

Andrea's 90210 Lost Diary of 1996: May 22, 1996 (Season 6) – "Dear Diary – Donna started dating Cliff the Fireman even though she still loves David, who inherited a ton of money and became manic depressive. Of course, he's the whitest rapper ever. Anyway, Steve finally told Kelly he started the high school rumors that she was a slut. I just love that Steve! Rather see you than be you!"

College Radio Cut of 1996: "What I Got" by Sublime

Then and Now 1996: Then - Gwyneth Paltrow & Brad Pitt / Now - Gwyneth Paltrow & Apple Martin, Then - Dominique Moceanu, 4'4" / Now - Dominique Moceanu, 5'3", and  Then - The Rosie O'Donnell Show / Now - The Ellen DeGeneres Show

1997
Air Force One
Kenny G breaks the world record for longest note held
"Bitch" by Meredith Brooks
"Death" of Joe Camel
Con Air
The beginning of ratings for TV shows (e.g. "TV-MA", "TV-14", "TV-PG") 
"Sex and Candy" by Marcy Playground
Latrell Sprewell chokes his coach and Marv Albert bites his girlfriend
The death of Chris Farley
Mary Kay Letourneau
The WNBA
"Fly" by Sugar Ray
Starship Troopers
Pokémon (covered again in I Love the 2000's)
Barbie and Paula Jones get makeovers
G.I. Jane
Titanic

Jay & Silent Bob's Guys We'll Go Gay For in 1997: Harrison Ford and George Clooney

Ben Stein's Pimpest Tracks of 1997: "Let Me Clear My Throat" by DJ Kool, "Been Around the World" by Puff Daddy & the Family and "No Diggity" by Blackstreet

Raw: Patrice O'Neal on Marv Albert

Bootyfone 1997: "You Make Me Wanna" by Usher, "In My Bed" by Dru Hill and "Nobody" by Keith Sweat

Andrea's 90210 Lost Diary of 1997: May 21, 1997 (Season 7) – "Dear Diary – Well, here's what's been going on in Beverly Hills, 90210 since I've been in New Haven, 06520. Brandon turned down a Seattle Times job offer so he could be editor of Steve's Springs paper handout Beverly thief. Donna was held hostage by a stalker, caught her mother cheating again, and finally lost her virginity to David. I can't believe she lost it to '97. Later!"

College Radio Cut of 1997: "All Is Full of Love" by Björk

Then and Now 1997: Then - Live with Regis and Kathie Lee / Now - Live with Regis and Kelly, Then - Flavored Vodkas / Now - Vodka & Red Bull, and Then - Barbie gets a makeover / Now - Barbie & Ken are no longer together

1998
Godzilla (American style)
Geri Halliwell leaves the Spice Girls
"Thank U" by Alanis Morissette
Raves
Blade
Buffy the Vampire Slayer 
Lay's WOW chips
Mad cow disease
Urban Legend
Gary Coleman punches a fan
Jesse Camp
"Ghetto Supastar (That Is What You Are)" by Pras
The Waterboy
Behind the Music 
"Smack My Bitch Up" by The Prodigy
Naomi Campbell throws a cell phone at an assistant
El Niño
Run Lola Run

Raw: Michael Ian Black on Raves

Ben Stein's Pimpest Tracks of 1998: "I Got the Hook Up" by Master P, "Find A Way" by A Tribe Called Quest and "Intergalactic" by Beastie Boys

Jay & Silent Bob's Guys We'll Go Gay For in 1998: Adam Sandler and Kevin Bacon

Bootyfone 1998: "Lately" by Divine, "All My Life" by K-Ci & JoJo and "The Boy is Mine" by Brandy & Monica

Andrea's 90210 Lost Diary of 1998: April 15, 1998 (Season 8) – "Dear Diary – Just got back from the Class of '93's fifth reunion. Can you believe it? Sure, I'm getting divorced, but at least I'm not blonde. Wait, maybe I am. Help! Kelly's addicted to coke, Donna's hooked on painkillers, and Dylan's back on the H. Just say no, people. Just say no. Tears!"

College Radio Cut of 1998: "Sexy Boy" by Air

Then and Now 1998: Then - Viagra / Now - Viagra & Levitra, Then - Bill Clinton & Monica Lewinsky / Now - Jim McGreevey & Golan Cipel, and  Then - Saving Private Ryan / Now - Lynndie England

1999
Freaks and Geeks
 Chris Gaines (the alterego of Garth Brooks)
TRL 
"Hard Knock Life" by Jay-Z
Emeril Lagasse
Red Bull
Lance Armstrong
Matthew McConaughey arrested for public disturbance (and is found playing the bongos naked)
Cruel Intentions
Limp Bizkit
SpongeBob SquarePants
The Tom Green Show
Win Ben Stein's Money 
Being John Malkovich
Varsity Blues

Raw: Juliette Lewis on Jay-Z

Ben Stein's Pimpest Tracks of 1999: "Can I Get A..." by Jay-Z, "Party Up" by DMX and "Love Is Blind" by Eve

Jay & Silent Bob's Guys We'll Go Gay For in 1999: James Van Der Beek and Jason Biggs

Bootyfone 1999: "Angel of Mine" by Monica, "Back at One" by Brian McKnight and "The Hardest Thing" by 98 Degrees

Andrea's 90210 Lost Diary of 1999: November 17, 1999 (Season 10) – "Dear Diary – Oh, well, yeah, I'm still a single mom working full-time and I've been at Yale since George Bush was. Dylan broke into the house of the guy who killed his father and wife, turned out the dad killed himself, like, 4 years ago. Dylan held the new occupant at gunpoint anyway. Oh, he's fun. Donna found out that her bulimic cousin Gina is actually her sister because her dad slept with her aunt, of course. Whatever!"

College Radio Cut of 1999: "My Own Worst Enemy" by Lit

Then and Now 1999: Then - Pokémon / Now - Yu-Gi-Oh!, Then - Governor Jesse Ventura / Now - Governor Arnold Schwarzenegger, and Then - Destiny's Child / Now – Beyoncé

External links
 

Nostalgia television shows
Nostalgia television in the United States
VH1 original programming
2000s American television miniseries
2005 American television series debuts
2005 American television series endings